Zagóra may refer to the following places:
Zagóra, Gmina Bełżec in Lublin Voivodeship (east Poland)
Zagóra, Gmina Susiec in Lublin Voivodeship (east Poland)
Zagóra, Włodawa County in Lublin Voivodeship (east Poland)
Zagóra, Zamość County in Lublin Voivodeship (east Poland)
Zagóra, Subcarpathian Voivodeship (south-east Poland)
Zagóra, Lubusz Voivodeship (west Poland)